Bagyavathi is a 1957 Indian Tamil-language drama film directed by L. V. Prasad and written by Ra. Ve, starring Sivaji Ganesan,  Padmini and M. N. Rajam. It was released on 27 December 1957.

Plot 

Somu, who is a criminal, marries Meena. Unable to expose Somu because of her love and devotion to him, she tries to transform him. In a separate storyline, Ravi, a six-year-old boy, learns that his father Suppanna is a criminal, and leaves his home. Suppanna also has a daughter, Bhama, who fails in her attempts to reform her father's ways. As a result, she kills herself.

Cast 

Male cast
 Sivaji Ganesan as Somu
 K. A. Thangavelu as Shankaran
 K. Sarangapani as Ramasami
 Boopathi Nandaram as Subbanna
 P. D. Sambandam as Saminathan
 Master Gopal as Ravi

Female
 Padmini as Meena
 Ragini as Suguna
 M. N. Rajam as Bama
 Lakshmi Prabha as Velammal
 K. N. Kamalam as Sooravalli
 K. Aranganayaki as Somu's mother

Supporting cast
 C. P. Kittan, V. P. S. Mani, Basupathi, V. T. Kalyanam, Santhanam, Ponnusami, Kunjitham Pillai, Jayasakthivel, G. V. Sharma, Shankaramoorthi, Therur Murugan, Kannan, Late Balaraman, Nanjilseth, Subbaraman, Rathnam, Sami & Party, P. R. Chandra, Seethalakshmi, and Kaurava Nathakar Sivasooryan.

Production 
A.C. Pillai, who was a small-time bank clerk-turned-film producer, made this film. It was written by Ra. Venkatachalam under the abbreviated "Ra. Ve". P. L. Rai was the cinematographer and the audiography was handled by A. Krishnan. The film was produced at Vijaya Vauhini Studios.

Soundtrack 
The music was composed by S. Dakshinamurthi and lyrics were written by A. Maruthakasi and Subbu Arumugam. The song "Kannale Vettadhe" was well received.

Release and reception 
Bagyavathi was released on 27 December 1957. The film wsa distributed by Subbu & Co in Madras. Film historian Randor Guy noted, "In spite of the stellar cast, interesting storyline and fine direction, the film did not do well".

References

External links 
 

1950s Tamil-language films
1957 films
Films directed by L. V. Prasad
Films scored by Susarla Dakshinamurthi